After Nine is a programme on the former United Kingdom Breakfast Television station TV-am. It ran from 09.00 until 09.25 during term time, finishing the day's broadcasting for TV-am. It concentrated on lifestyle issues such as fashion and health, and originally was presented by Jayne Irving and latterly by Kathy Tayler. It generally finished with a workout by Lizzie Webb, the station's fitness expert.
After Nine ran from 1985 until 18th December 1992, prior to TV-am ending broadcasting at the end of 1992.

TV-am original programming
1985 British television series debuts
1992 British television series endings